Following is a list of the 1995–96 Belgian First Division season.

The Belgian Pro League (officially known as Jupiler Pro League []) is the top league competition for association football clubs in Belgium. Contested by 16 clubs, it operates on a system of promotion and relegation with the Belgian Second Division. The competition was created in 1895 by the Royal Belgian Football Association and was first won by FC Liégeois.

Club Brugge won the title of the 1995–96 season.

Relegated teams

These teams were relegated to the second division at the end of the season:
R.F.C. Seraing
K.S.K. Beveren
K.S.V. Waregem

Final league table

Results

Top goalscorers

References

Belgian Pro League seasons
Belgian
1995–96 in Belgian football